Srđan Lopičić (born 20 November 1983) is a Montenegrin former professional footballer who played as an attacking midfielder. He is currently an assistant manager in Borneo.

Club career 
Lopičić played for several clubs in his native Montenegro before moving abroad to play in Indonesia for eight years. At the start of 2014, he joined Persela Lamongan from Persebaya DU and on December 20, 2014, he signed with Pusamania Borneo.

He was released by Persib Bandung in May 2019.

Honours 
Petrovac
Winner
Montenegrin Cup: 2008–09

References

External links 
 

1983 births
Living people
Sportspeople from Cetinje
Association football midfielders
Serbia and Montenegro footballers
Montenegrin footballers
Montenegro under-21 international footballers
FK Lovćen players
FK Crvena Stijena players
FK Rudar Pljevlja players
FK Hajduk Beograd players
FK Mogren players
FK Bokelj players
OFK Petrovac players
R. Olympic Charleroi Châtelet Farciennes players
Persela Lamongan players
Borneo F.C. players
Liga 1 (Indonesia) players
Arema F.C. players
South China AA players
Persiba Balikpapan players
Persib Bandung players
First League of Serbia and Montenegro players
Montenegrin First League players
Belgian Third Division players
Indonesian Premier Division players
Hong Kong Premier League players
Montenegrin expatriate footballers
Expatriate footballers in Belgium
Montenegrin expatriate sportspeople in Belgium
Expatriate footballers in Indonesia
Montenegrin expatriate sportspeople in Indonesia
Expatriate footballers in Hong Kong
Montenegrin expatriate sportspeople in Hong Kong